Blubberknife (also known as Many a Wonderful Picnic Has Been Ruined by Blubberknife) is the third studio album released by the Australian experimental group Severed Heads, originally as a C90 cassette tape. The first approximately 200 copies were packaged inside cassette cases that were spray-painted silver, stuffed with loose cassette tape and had parts from the insides of television sets glued to the front of the case. Five copies were specially packaged inside fully operational calculators. It's the first album by the group to feature contributions by Stephen Jones, and it is also the first recording by the group to catch the attention of UK label Ink Records, who helped release Since the Accident a year later and reissued Blubberknife in a standard cassette case with new artwork in 1984. As with most of their discography, Blubberknife has been reissued several times.

Track listing
Original C90 cassette (Terse Tapes (Australia)--TRS822–1982; Ink (UK)--IT 00A—1984)

Double C90 cassette reissue (Terse Tapes (Australia)--Terse 881–1988)

This reissue incorporated almost all of the contents of the 1985 2LP release Clifford Darling Please Don't Live in the Past.
Double CD-R/Bandcamp download reissue (SevCom (Australia)--2002) 

3-12 are the full live performance at the Stranded Club, divided into tracks based on the main tape loop used in that part.  The Bandcamp version restored these to one 33:54 track, and also combined 14 and 15 into one track (7:42).

Early releases of the CD-R set divided "Nightsong [Live]" into the main track (9:29) and an untitled ninth track (4:30).

Personnel
Tom Ellard - synthesizers, tape loops
Simon Knuckey - guitars
Garry Bradbury - synthesizers, tape loops
Richard Fielding - synthesizers, tape loops
Stephen Jones - video synthesizers, artwork
Grahame Brown - recording on "Rocket Summer"
Philip Samartzis - recording on "J. Edgar Hoover" and "CMID"

References

External links
 

Severed Heads albums
1982 albums